Todd Wallace Robinson (born 1967) is an American lawyer and jurist who serves as a United States district judge of the United States District Court for the Southern District of California and was formerly Assistant United States Attorney for the same district.

Education 

Robinson earned his Bachelor of Arts from the University of California, Berkeley, and his Juris Doctor, cum laude, from the Georgetown University Law Center.

Legal career 

Robinson began his career as a trial attorney in the United States Department of Justice Criminal Division's Narcotic and Dangerous Drug Section, where he worked from 1993 to 1997. In 1997, he became an Assistant United States Attorney for the Southern District of California. In 2004, Robinson served as an Operations Officer with the Central Intelligence Agency. He then returned to the United States Attorney's Office and was Deputy Chief of the General Crimes Section in 2007. From 2008 to 2020, he served as Senior Litigation Counsel in the Criminal Division. He left the Office after becoming a judge.

Federal judicial service 

On September 12, 2019, President Donald Trump announced his intent to nominate Robinson to serve as a United States district judge of the United States District Court for the Southern District of California. On November 21, 2019, his nomination was sent to the Senate. President Trump nominated Robinson to the seat on the United States District Court for the Southern District of California vacated by Judge Marilyn L. Huff, who assumed senior status on September 30, 2016. On January 3, 2020, his nomination was returned to the President under Rule XXXI, Paragraph 6 of the United States Senate. On February 13, 2020, his renomination was sent to the Senate. On June 17, 2020, a hearing on his nomination was held before the Senate Judiciary Committee.  On July 23, 2020, his nomination was reported out of committee by a voice vote. On September 15, 2020, the Senate invoked cloture on his nomination by a 83–13 vote. On September 16, 2020, his nomination was confirmed by a 86–10 vote. He received his judicial commission on September 18, 2020.

References

External links 
 

1967 births
Living people
20th-century American lawyers
21st-century American lawyers
21st-century American judges
Assistant United States Attorneys
California lawyers
Federalist Society members
Georgetown University Law Center alumni
Judges of the United States District Court for the Southern District of California
People from Jacksonville, Florida
People of the Central Intelligence Agency
United States Department of Justice lawyers
United States district court judges appointed by Donald Trump
University of California, Berkeley alumni